The Táin Bó Regamon is an Irish story written c. A.D.800–c. A.D. 900. A version of it exists in the Yellow Book of Lecan.

One of the Táin Bó tales of early Irish literature, the Táin Bó Regamon was by one of more authors during the 9th century and linguisticly belongs to the Old Irish era. It is found in Egerton 1782.

It tells the story of the Connachtman Regamon - apparently a misspelling of Regamain - who is described as "a famous warrior and hospitaller". He is described as living at a dún ('fort') "in the south of Connacht near to the boundary of the Corcmodruad (Corcomroe (barony)) in Nindus (see Eóganacht Ninussa).

His seven daughters contest the seven sons of Queen Medb and King Ailill over "a gift from his herd ... because of this difficulty which is upon us in maintaining the men of Ireland in driving off the cattle of Cúailnge."

In 2016, Danielle Malek donated her edition to the Corpus of Electronic Texts, a repository of documents pertaining to Irish history and culture.

Select bibliography

 "Táin Bó Regamon", Danielle Malek (ed), First edition [One volume. vi + 89 pp.] University of Sydney, 2002

External links
 http://www.ucc.ie/celt/published/G301004/index.html

Medieval literature
Irish literature
Early Irish literature
Irish-language literature
Irish texts
Ireland in fiction